Singanallur Venkataramana Iyer Sahasranamam (29 November 1913 – 19 February 1988), also known as S. V. S., was an Indian actor and director. Primarily a theatre actor, he also worked in over 200 films, mainly in Tamil cinema.

Early life 
Sahasranamam was born on 29 November 1913 at Singanallur. He was the fourth child born to Venkatraman and Parvathi. Because of his interest in acting, he left his home at an early age to join the Madurai Sri Balashanmuganandha Sabha, a popular theatre group, which was later renamed T. K. S. Nataka Sabha.

Career 
Several years after he joined T. K. S. Nataka Sabha, Sahasranamam started his own theatre group titled "Seva Stage". With that, he staged several popular plays such as Kangal, Irulum Oliyum and Vadivelu Vaathiyar. These plays were later adapted into feature films and were commercially successful. He also adapted the novels of writers such as B. S. Ramiah, T. Janakiraman and Ku Pa Rajagopalan, and made them into feature films. Although Sahasranamam was also successful in cinema, having acted in over 200 films since debuting in that field with Menaka (1935), he always considered theatre his main interest.

Awards 
Sahasranamam won the Sangeet Natak Akademi Award for Acting (Tamil) in 1967, and received the Sangeetha Kalasikhamani award in 1980 by the Indian Fine Arts Society, Chennai.

Illness and death 
Between March 1974 and February 1988, Sahasranamam had suffered more than five heart attacks. He had chosen the artists for the play Nandha Vilakku, authored by novelist/dramatist Krishnamani, and asked them to come for a rehearsal on 21 February. But he suffered a heart attack on 19 February 1988 and died at 4:30 pm IST. Sahasranamam's son S. V. S. Kumar is also an actor.

Partial filmography

References

Bibliography

External links 
 

1913 births
1988 deaths
20th-century Indian male actors
Actors in Tamil theatre
Indian male stage actors
Male actors in Tamil cinema
People from Coimbatore
Recipients of the Sangeet Natak Akademi Award